Finland competed at the 2006 Winter Olympics in Turin, Italy, with 102 athletes competing in 11 of the 15 sports.

Janne Lahtela, a moguls freestyle skier and a defending Olympic champion, was the flag bearer at the Opening Ceremonies.

Medalists

Alpine skiing 

Note: In the men's combined, run 1 is the downhill, and runs 2 and 3 are the slalom. In the women's combined, run 1 and 2 are the slalom, and run 3 the downhill.

Biathlon 

Paavo Puurunen was the only Finnish biathlete who competed in Torino.

Cross-country skiing 

Six men and six women participated in the cross-country skiing events, making the cross-country skiing squad the largest squad for any individual sport.
Distance

Men

Women

Sprint

Curling

Men's

: Markku Uusipaavalniemi (skip), Wille Mäkelä, Kalle Kiiskinen, Teemu Salo, Jani Sullanmaa (alternate)

Finland sent a men's curling team to the Olympics, the same team which finished fifth at the 2005 Ford World Men's Curling Championship.

Round-robin
Draw 1
;Draw 2
;Draw 4
;Draw 5
;Draw 7
;Draw 8
;Draw 9
;Draw 10
;Draw 11

Standings

Playoffs
Semifinal
;Final

Figure skating 

Susanna Pöykiö and Kiira Korpi were selected for the women's competition. Pöykiö has won a silver at the 2005 European Figure Skating Championships (held in Torino), while Korpi's best European placing prior to the Olympics was sixth.

Key: CD = Compulsory Dance, FD = Free Dance, FS = Free Skate, OD = Original Dance, SP = Short Program

Freestyle skiing 

Five Finnish men were entered in the freestyle competition, all in the moguls Since only four entrants were allowed, Tapio Luusua ended up as an alternate.

Ice hockey

Men's

The Finnish men's team finished atop its Round-robin group, which including beating both previous Olympic gold medalists, the Czech Republic and Canada, and beat the United States and Russia to make the final, where it lost to Sweden to finish in the silver medal position.

Roster

Round-robin

Medal round

Quarterfinal

Semifinal

Final

Women's

The Finnish women's team finished second to the United States in the round-robin section of the competition, but lost to both North American teams in the medal round to end up in fourth place.

Players

Round-robin

Medal round

Semifinal

Bronze medal game

Nordic combined 

Note: 'Deficit' refers to the amount of time behind the leader a competitor began the cross-country portion of the event. Italicized numbers show the final deficit from the winner's finishing time.

Ski jumping 

Note: PQ indicates a skier was pre-qualified for the final, based on entry rankings.

Snowboarding 

Halfpipe

Note: In the final, the single best score from two runs is used to determine the ranking. A bracketed score indicates a run that wasn't counted.

Parallel GS

Speed skating

Notes and references

Winter Olympics
2006
Nations at the 2006 Winter Olympics